This article is a list of historic places in the Bonavista Bay region of the Canadian province of Newfoundland and Labrador. These properties are entered on the Canadian Register of Historic Places, whether they are federal, provincial, or municipal. The list contains entries found in communities on the Bonavista Peninsula, from Clarenville north and east.

List of historic places

See also
 List of historic places in Newfoundland and Labrador
 List of National Historic Sites of Canada in Newfoundland and Labrador

Bonavista